Venkatagiri mandal is one of the 34 mandals in Tirupati district in the Indian state of Andhra Pradesh. It is a part of Gudur revenue division.

History 
Venkatagiri mandal used to be a part of Nellore district and was made part of the newly formed Tirupati district on 4 April 2022.

Demographics 

Scheduled Castes and Scheduled Tribes made up 17,571 and 6,214 of the population respectively. It had a literacy rate of 69.59% with 77.3% among males and 61.95% among females.

Administration 
Venkatagiri mandal is a part of Gudur revenue division.

Politics 
Venkatagiri mandal is a part of Venkatagiri Assembly constituency and Tirupati Lok Sabha constituency. , the mandal had 60,838 eligible voters with 29,814 male voters and 31,024 female voters.

References 

Mandals in Tirupati district